Shakeel Ahmed (also known as Shakeel Chaudhary; born 1989) is an assistant professor of chemistry in the Department of Higher Education, Government of Jammu and Kashmir. He is listed among the top 2% most cited scientists of the world by Stanford University. He is the elected fellow of International Society for Development and Sustainability and is recipient of Young Scientist Award and Best Professor of the Year Award 2020.

Biography 
Shakeel Ahmed was born and raised in the small village Dhangri (Doba) of Rajouri district, Jammu and Kashmir. He obtained his bachelor's degree from Government Post Graduate College Rajouri. He obtained a master's and Ph.D. degree in Chemistry from Jamia Millia Islamia, New Delhi.

Academic research 
Ahmed's areas of interest include green materials and bionanocomposites. He has published several research articles and books in the area of polymer nanocomposites, biopolymer and green nanomaterials.

Books 
 Advanced Green Materials
 Applications of Advanced Green Materials
 Bionanocomposites in Tissue Engineering and Regenerative Medicine
 Chitosan
 Biocomposites
 Biobased Materials for Food Packaging
 Handbook of Bionanocomposites

 Bionanocomposites for Food Packaging Applications 
 Alginates
 Recycling from Waste in Fashion and Textiles
 Green Metal Nanoparticles
 Composites for Environmental Engineering
 Green and Sustainable Advanced Materials, Volume 1: Processing and Characterization
 Green and Sustainable Advanced Materials, Volume 2: Applications

References

External links 

1989 births
Living people
Jamia Millia Islamia alumni
People from Rajouri district